Charlotte Kemp Muhl (born August 17, 1987), also known as Kemp Muhl, is an American singer-songwriter, writer, model and film director from Atlanta, Georgia. She is best known as a model for Maybelline. 

Muhl has been in a relationship with Sean Lennon since 2007 and performs with him in the musical duo The Ghost of a Saber Tooth Tiger. She is also the bassist for the group UNI and The Urchins, which released their debut album in January 2023.

Career

Musical career
Muhl is a singer, a songwriter and multi-instrumentalist, playing guitar, bass, keyboard, and the accordion. Muhl has stated that she uses funds earned from her modeling career to produce her music. Muhl and Sean Lennon formed the record company Chimera Music.

In 2017, Muhl founded the band Uni, currently including vocalist Jack James and guitarist David Strange.  On November 17, 2017, with their original vocalist Nico, they released their debut 7" single What's the Problem b/w Adult Video. Both songs on the single had a music video, directed by Muhl, produced for them. "Mushroom Cloud", their second 7" single, was released March 23, 2018, with a video debuted on Rolling stone.

Modeling
Muhl has a successful modeling career. She was under contract with Maybelline for 10 years, and has been featured in campaigns for Tommy Hilfiger, Sisley, D&G, Donna Karan, Swarovski, and Jennifer Lopez’s brand J.Lo. She has worked with Ellen Von Unwerth, Terry Richardson, Greg Kadel, Gilles Bensimon, and Steven Klein. From 2002–2005, Muhl was the spokesmodel of Vidal Sassoon in Asia, appearing in commercials and films across the continent.

Music videos appeared in
 Imbranato music video by Tiziano Ferro (2002)
 Purple music video by Whirlwind Heat (2003)
 Just Feel Better music video by Carlos Santana (2005)
 Music video for Lolita (song by Elefant) (2006)
 Music video for "Find A New Way (Terry Richardson Version)" (song by Young Love) (2007)

Music videos directed
 "Debris", by Uni
 "DDT", by Uni
 "Electric Universe", by Uni
 "American F*g", by Uni
 "Act One", by Invisible Familiars
 "Black Hanz", by The Moonlandingz
 "Blood and Guts", by Mark Stoermer
 "What's The Problem?", by Uni
 "Adult Video", by Uni
 "Donna Marijuana", by Uni

Personal life
Muhl met Sean Lennon at the Coachella Valley Music and Arts Festival in 2005, and the two have been in a relationship since 2007. In an interview, Lennon stated that he discovered Muhl was musically talented over a year after they had started dating. Muhl and Lennon are involved in a number of musical endeavours, and much of their work is written at their own home-based studio in Greenwich Village.

References

External links

Chimera Music

1987 births
Living people
Actresses from Atlanta
American accordionists
Women accordionists
American women guitarists
Female models from Georgia (U.S. state)
American rock keyboardists
American multi-instrumentalists
American rock bass guitarists
Anti-Korean sentiment
Women bass guitarists
Musicians from Atlanta
Guitarists from Georgia (U.S. state)
21st-century accordionists
21st-century American women musicians
21st-century American singers
21st-century American women singers
21st-century American bass guitarists
The Ghost of a Saber Tooth Tiger members
Elite Model Management models